Tom Chorlton (1880–1948) was a footballer who played for Liverpool in the early 20th century.

Life and playing career

Born in Heaton Mersey, Stockport, Cheshire England, Chorlton played for All Saints F.C, Northern F.C, Stockport and Accrington Stanley before being signed by Liverpool manager Tom Watson in May 1904. He made his debut in a Football League Division One match on 24 September 1904, scoring his first goal on 29 October. Chorlton spent most of his early days at Anfield flitting in and out of the side, making just 12 appearances in his first season and 27 over the following three campaigns. It was the 1908–09 term that saw Chorlton establish himself as a first choice player, eventually making 35 appearances. Chorlton followed that up with an ever-present season in 1909–10, the only Red to do so. He started the 1910–11 season as  a regular, making 7 appearances in 10 games, but lost his place and never really regained it. For a time Chorlton was the club's penalty-taker, which helped him hit 8 goals in his 121 outings for the Anfield club.

Chorlton was transferred to Manchester United in August 1912, one of the few players to have moved directly between the bitter rivals. Chorlton also went on to play for Stalybridge Celtic. His brother, Charles, also played professionally, for Bury.

Honours

Football League Second Division (Level 2): 1905

External links
Profile at LFCHistory.net

1880s births
1952 deaths
Stockport County F.C. players
Accrington Stanley F.C. (1891) players
Liverpool F.C. players
Manchester United F.C. players
English footballers
Stalybridge Celtic F.C. players
English Football League players
Association football defenders
Manchester City F.C. non-playing staff